Orosabad (also Romanized as Orosābād, Oroos Abad, Orūsābād, and Owrosābād; also known as Urusatabad) is a village in Eqbal-e Gharbi Rural District, in the Central District of Qazvin County, Qazvin Province, Iran. At the 2006 census, its population was 723, in 145 families.

References 

Populated places in Qazvin County